The 2012 season was LionsXII's debut season in the Malaysia Super League. LionsXII returned to Malaysia competitions 18 years after their predecessor withdrew from the competitions. The Lions finished MSL runners-up at the end of the season.

Malaysia Super League

LionsXII debuted in the 2012 Malaysia Super League on 10 January 2012 with a 1–2 home defeat to defending champions Kelantan FA. The Lions's first win was a 2–1 victory over Kuala Lumpur FA on 17 January. They achieved the biggest win in the season by defeating Sabah FA 9–0 on 16 June 2012. LionsXII eventually finished second in the league behind Kelantan FA.

On 29 December 2012, assistant coach Kadir Yahaya left his position at LionsXII and was replaced by Gombak United FC chief K. Balagumaran.

Final standings

Malaysia FA Cup

LionsXII began their 2012 Malaysia FA Cup quest on 18 February, with a 3–0 win over UiTM FC. The LionsXII made their way to the quarter-final with a 2–0 win over Betaria FC on 10 March 2012. However, they were beaten by Terengganu FA in the quarter-finals.

Malaysia Cup

The Lions marked their return to their most successful competition with a 0–0 draw away to Johor FC. They eventually bowed out in the semi-finals after losing a penalty shootout to ATM FA with the score tied at 2–2 after extra time.

Squad statistics

 LionsXII were restricted to Under-28 players in their first MSL season.
 The number 12 is retired in honour of the fans, also known as the "twelfth man".

References

LionsXII seasons
Lions
2012 in Malaysian football